Rådhuset metro station is a rapid transit station in Kungsholmen in central Stockholm, part of the Stockholm metro. The station is located on the blue line between T-Centralen and Fridhemsplan and was opened  on 31 August 1975 as part the first stretch of the Blue Line between T-Centralen and Hjulsta. The trains were running via Hallonbergen and Rinkeby.

Like some other stations on the Stockholm metro, it uses organic architecture, which leaves the bedrock exposed and unsculptured, appearing to be based on natural cave systems.

The underground station is named after Rådhuset (The Courthouse) right above the surface. The City Hall and the Police Headquarters are also located in the vicinity.

Gallery

References

External links

Images of Rådhuset

Blue line (Stockholm metro) stations
Railway stations opened in 1975